Originally built as  light cruisers (CL) in the United States Navy during World War II, in 1957 three ships were re-designated as Galveston-class guided missile light cruisers (CLG) and fitted with the Talos long-range surface-to-air missile system.  During the two-year refit under project SCB 140, the aft superstructure was completely replaced and all aft guns were removed to make room for the twin-arm Talos launcher and a 46-missile storage magazine.  Three large masts were also installed in order to hold a variety of radars, missile guidance, and communications systems.  Little Rock and Oklahoma City were simultaneously converted into fleet flagships under SCB 140A, which involved removing two forward dual  and one triple  turrets, and replacing them with a massively rebuilt and expanded forward superstructure.  Galveston, in the non-flagship configuration, retained the Cleveland-class's standard forward weapons: three dual  and two triple  turrets.

Providence and Springfield were outfitted as fleet flagships, but Topeka was not.

Like the Providence class cruisers, the Galveston class ships suffered from serious stability problems caused by the topweight of the missile system. Indeed, the Galveston class ships were more affected by heavy Talos missile system than the Terrier equipped ships. Weight reduction measures and the use of ballast were necessary to improve stability. The cruisers, particularly Galveston, also suffered from hogging of the hull.

All three Galveston-class ships were decommissioned to the reserve fleet between 1970 and 1979.  In the 1975 cruiser realignment, Little Rock and Oklahoma City were reclassified as guided missile cruisers (CG).  The ships were stricken from the Naval Vessel Register between 1973 and 1979.  Galveston was scrapped in the mid-1970s, Oklahoma City was sunk as a target in 1999, and Little Rock is a museum ship in Buffalo, NY.

Ships in class

See also
 List of cruisers of the United States Navy

References

External links
hazegray.org
US Naval Historical Center

Cruiser classes